Mimoeme is a genus of beetles in the family Cerambycidae, containing the following species:

 Mimoeme lycoides Chemsak & Linsley, 1967
 Mimoeme pseudamerica Touroult, Dalens & Tavakilian, 2010

References

Xystrocerini